Trogogonia is a genus of moths of the family Erebidae. The genus was erected by George Hampson in 1926.

Species
Trogogonia abrupta (Walker, 1862) Brazil (Amazonas)
Trogogonia tenebrosa Barbut & Lalanne-Cassou, 2012 French Guiana

References

Calpinae